Pavel Lieth (born 28 December 1883, date of death unknown) was a Russian Empire sports shooter. He competed in two events at the 1912 Summer Olympics.

References

1883 births
Year of death missing
Male sport shooters from the Russian Empire
Olympic competitors for the Russian Empire
Shooters at the 1912 Summer Olympics
Sportspeople from Tver